Out of Mind, Out of Sight may refer to:

"Out of Mind, Out of Sight" (Buffy the Vampire Slayer), a 1997 television episode
"Out of Mind, Out of Sight" (song), a 1985 song by the Australian group Models
Out of Mind, Out of Sight (album), a 1985 album by the Australian group Models
Out of Mind, Out of Sight (film), a 2014 Canadian documentary film by John Kastner

See also
"Out of Sight, Out of Mind", a 1976 episode of the M*A*S*H television series
 Out of Sight, Out of Mind (1990 film), a 1990 film directed by Greydon Clark